Kyauktawgyi Buddha Temple may refer to:

 Kyauktawgyi Buddha Temple (Mandalay)
 Kyauktawgyi Buddha Temple (Yangon)
 Kyauktawgyi Pagoda, located in Amarapura, Mandalay.